Elachista kosteri is a moth of the family Elachistidae which is endemic to Greece.

The species is nocturnal.

References

kosteri
Moths described in 1995
Endemic fauna of Greece
Moths of Europe